The Balikpapan Massacre involved the killing of 78 unarmed Dutch civilians and prisoners of war by the Japanese 56th Division near the seaport city of Balikpapan in February 24 1942.

Events
On January 20, 1942, a small vessel was spotted heading for Balikpapan by the Dutch airforce. A flying-boat landed near the vessel, which was found to contain two KNIL Captains. The two men had been captured and spared the massacre of 215 Dutch POWs at Tarakan, whose oilfields had been destroyed prior to Japanese capture. Aiming to prevent a similar fate of the oilfields at Balikpapan, they carried an ultimatum on behalf of the Japanese stating that all Dutchmen would be summarily executed should the Palikpapan oilfields be destroyed. The Japanese ultimatum had the opposite effect however, as the commanding officer Lieutenant Colonel Van den Hoogenband immediately ordered demolition teams to destroy the Balikpapan oilfields.

In the night of the 23rd January and the morning of the 24th January Japanese units landed near Balikpapan, meeting no opposition as the Dutch soldiers had been ordered to try and escape the area. Realizing the oil fields had been destroyed, the Japanese began rounding up the remaining Dutchmen, which, apart from 62 Dutch POWs, included two civil servants, a police inspector, a medical officer, eight patients from Balikpapan hospital and three priests. On February 23 all captives were taking to the beach, where the two civil servants were beheaded and the remainder was chased into the sea, where they were all shot one at a time over a period of approximately two hours. Indonesians from neighboring villages had been brought in to watch the executions.

References

Sources

Massacres in 1942
February 1942 events
Japanese war crimes
Mass murder in 1942
History of the Dutch East Indies
1942 in the Dutch East Indies